Edward John White (May 18, 1949 – August 26, 2005) was a Canadian professional wrestler, best known as Sailor White and as Moondog King of The Moondogs when he joined the World Wrestling Federation (now WWE) in the early 1980s. White won championships in Canada and around the globe. He also wrestled in South Africa as Big John Strongbo.

Professional wrestling career
After doing work on Great Lakes boats, White made his professional wrestling debut in Pembroke, Ontario on May 22, 1972 against Michael Gango for promoter Larry Kasaboski. While in Quebec he was the Grand Prix tag team champion in 1976, International Heavyweight champion in 1982, International tag team champion twice in 1982–1984 and won the Canadian Television Championship in 1984.

He was most known for his time in the WWF as Moondog King where he teamed with Moondog Rex and won the WWF Tag Team Championship (then WWWF) from Tony Garea and Rick Martel in Allentown, Pennsylvania in March 1981.

After he was denied re-entry to the United States at the Canada–United States border, the WWWF replaced him with substitutes including Stan Hansen, Hulk Hogan, Lou Albano and Sgt. Slaughter before selecting Moondog Spot as a permanent replacement. Gorilla Monsoon explained his absence stating King had been hit by a car. White claims the border dispute involved a rival wrestling promoter alerting the authorities to his criminal past whereas some say it was drug related.

After the WWF, he worked in Montreal for Lutte Internationale teaming with Gilles Poisson. He retired from wrestling in 1986. Then on October 22, 1990, he returned to a WWF house show as "Sailor Moondog White" where he lost to The British Bulldog at the Ottawa Civic Center. In 1991, he appeared a few appearances for World Championship Wrestling in house shows where he fought against Brad Armstrong. His last match was a victory over Mike Winter.   

White ran twice for Canada's House of Commons. In April 2000, White in a St. John's West by-election for the Canadian Extreme Wrestling Party. His motto was "Parliament Needs a Moondog". On July 28, 2004, White ran for the House of Commons of Canada, representing the Green Party of Canada in Bonavista—Exploits, but lost to Scott Simms of the Liberal Party of Canada. White received 367 votes to Simms's 15,970.

Illness and death
He suffered from Bell's palsy in 1999 and had two heart attacks by then. In 2002, he underwent triple bypass surgery and on December 2, 2004, his taxi crashed, breaking two bones in his neck and pinching a nerve in his spinal cord. He remained hospitalized on life support until his death on August 26, 2005. White was survived by his daughter, Rozlynn Mbarki, and grandchildren, Keygan Hewitt, Hudson, Owen, Ethan and Quinton. His biography Sailor White was written by Dave Elliott.

Championships and accomplishments
Eastern Sports Association
NWA Canadian Heavyweight Championship (Halifax version) (1 time)

Lutte Internationale
Canadian International Heavyweight Championship (1 time)
Canadian International Tag Team Championship (3 times) – with Serge Dumont (1), Gilles Poisson (1), and Rick Valentine (1)

World Wrestling Federation
WWF Tag Team Championship (1 time) – with Moondog Rex

References

External links
Redemption of Sailor White
Gary Will's Canadian Pro Wrestling Page of Fame: Sailor White

1949 births
2005 deaths
20th-century professional wrestlers
Canadian male professional wrestlers
Canadian sportsperson-politicians
Green Party of Canada candidates in the 2004 Canadian federal election
Independent candidates in the 2000 Canadian federal election
Newfoundland and Labrador candidates for Member of Parliament
Professional wrestlers from Newfoundland and Labrador
Sportspeople from St. John's, Newfoundland and Labrador